Rafael Katsutoshi Henmi (born 30 July 1992) is a Japanese futsal player who last played as a winger for Portuguese club Benfica and the Japan national team.

Honours
Benfica
Campeonato Nacional: 2014–15, 2018–19
Taça de Portugal: 2014–15, 2016–17
Taça da Liga: 2017–18, 2018–19, 2019–20
Supertaça de Portugal: 2016

References

External links
 S.L. Benfica profile  (archived)
 
 

1992 births
Living people
Futsal forwards
Japanese men's futsal players
Nagoya Oceans players
S.L. Benfica futsal players
Japanese expatriate sportspeople in the United Arab Emirates
Japanese expatriate sportspeople in Portugal

Japanese people of Brazilian descent
Brazilian people of Japanese descent